Bertram C. Granger (March 31, 1892 – October 28, 1967) was an American set decorator. He was nominated for two Academy Awards in the category Best Art Direction. He was born in Wyoming and died in Los Angeles, California.

Selected filmography
Granger was nominated for two Academy Awards for Best Art Direction:
 Five Graves to Cairo (1943)
 For Whom the Bell Tolls (1943)

References

External links

American set decorators
Artists from Wyoming
1892 births
1967 deaths